Neil Mulholland (born 13 February 1980) is a Northern Irish international lawn bowler.

Bowls career
He won a silver medal in the men's triples at the 2014 Commonwealth Games. In 2015 he won the triples and fours bronze medals at the Atlantic Bowls Championships.

In 2016 he was part of the fours team with Martin McHugh, Simon Martin and Ian McClure that won a bronze medal at the 2016 World Outdoor Bowls Championship in Christchurch.

He won the 2014 Irish National Bowls Championships singles  and in 2015 he became the World Singles Champion of Champions defeating Fairul Izwan Abd Muin of Malaysia in the final.

In 2019 he won the fours bronze medal at the Atlantic Bowls Championships.

References

1980 births
Living people
Commonwealth Games silver medallists for Northern Ireland
Bowls players at the 2014 Commonwealth Games
Male lawn bowls players from Northern Ireland
Commonwealth Games medallists in lawn bowls
Sportspeople from Lisburn
Medallists at the 2014 Commonwealth Games